Huntsville/Deerhurst Resort Airport  was located  northeast of Huntsville, Ontario, Canada.
 
Airfield buildings still stand, but the runway is marked with X on either end to indicate that it is now closed.

See also
Huntsville Water Aerodrome
Huntsville/Bella Lake Water Aerodrome

References

Defunct airports in Ontario
Transport in Huntsville, Ontario
Buildings and structures in the District Municipality of Muskoka